Cornelius Williams (September 16, 1819March 27, 1891) was an American farmer, politician, and Wisconsin pioneer.  He was a member of the Wisconsin State Assembly, representing Kenosha County in the 1880 session.

Biography
Cornelius Williams was born September 16, 1819, in Copake, New York. He was raised and educated on his father's farm and worked for several years as a teacher in Columbia County, New York.

In 1854, he traveled west to Kenosha County, Wisconsin, and purchased a tract of undeveloped land in the town of Bristol.  He would cultivate this land into a farm and remain there for the rest of his life.  By the time of his death, the farm had grown to 350 acres.

Williams was always a staunch Republican in politics.  He served on the Bristol school board and the Kenosha County board of supervisors, and, in 1879, he was elected to the Wisconsin State Assembly on the Republican ticket.  He served only one term, and his district comprised all of Kenosha County.  He did not run for re-election in 1880.

He died at his home in Bristol on March 27, 1891.

Personal life and family
The Williams family were of Welsh American descent.  Cornelius Williams married Catherine Trafford, who was also a native of Columbia County, New York.  They had four children together, but their first two children died in the 1846–1860 cholera pandemic.  Only one child survived them, their son Clarence.

Clarence E. Williams also went on to serve on the Kenosha County board of supervisors and the Bristol school board.

Electoral history

Wisconsin Assembly (1879)

| colspan="6" style="text-align:center;background-color: #e9e9e9;"| General Election, November 4, 1879

References

External links
 

1819 births
1891 deaths
People from Columbia County, New York
People from Bristol, Kenosha County, Wisconsin
Farmers from Wisconsin
County supervisors in Wisconsin
Republican Party members of the Wisconsin State Assembly
19th-century American politicians